The 2021 Pittsburgh Panthers women's soccer team represented University of Pittsburgh during the 2021 NCAA Division I women's soccer season.  The Panthers were led by head coach Randy Waldrum, in his fourth season.  They played home games at Ambrose Urbanic Field.  This was the team's 26th season playing organized women's college soccer and their 9th playing in the Atlantic Coast Conference.

The Panthers finished the season 11–7–0 overall, and 4–6–0 in ACC play to finish in ninth place.  They did not qualify for the ACC Tournament and were not invited to the NCAA Tournament.

Previous season 

Due to the COVID-19 pandemic, the ACC played a reduced schedule in 2020 and the NCAA Tournament was postponed to 2021.  The ACC did not play a spring league schedule, but did allow teams to play non-conference games that would count toward their 2020 record in the lead up to the NCAA Tournament.

The Panthers finished the fall season 9–5–0, 3–5–0 in ACC play to finish in tenth place. They did not qualify for the ACC Tournament.  The team won both games of their extra spring season.  They were not invited to the NCAA Tournament.

Squad

Roster

Team management

Source:

Schedule

Source:

|-
!colspan=6 style=""| Exhibition

|-
!colspan=6 style=""| Non-Conference Regular Season

|-
!colspan=6 style=""| ACC Regular season

Rankings

References

Pittsburgh
Pittsburgh
2021
Pittsburgh women's soccer